Jane Chambers (March 27, 1937 – February 15, 1983) was an American playwright. She was a "pioneer in writing theatrical works with openly lesbian characters".

Chambers was born in Columbia, South Carolina, but grew up in Orlando, Florida, where she started writing with scripts for local public radio stations. She studied at Rollins College, intending to become a playwright, but dropped out of Rollins after she encountered discrimination as a woman there. After studying acting for a season at the Pasadena Playhouse in 1956, she moved to New York City and then on to Poland Spring, Maine, where she worked for WMTW. Returning to New York in 1968, she enrolled at Goddard College, Vermont to try again for an undergraduate degree. There she met Beth Allen, who would remain her lover, companion and manager.

Completing her degree in 1971, Chambers began to achieve recognition as a writer: she won the Rosenthal Award for Poetry, and her play Christ in a Treehouse, won a Connecticut Educational Television Award. In 1972 she received a Eugene O'Neill Fellowship for Tales of the Revolution and Other American Fables, staged at the Eugene O'Neill Memorial Theater. She helped establish theater at the Women's Interart Center in New York, putting on her play Random Violence there in 1972. Her writing for the soap opera Search for Tomorrow won her a Writers Guild of America Award in 1973. A Late Snow, produced at Playwrights Horizons in 1974 was one of the earliest plays to portray lesbian characters in a positive light. In 1980 Chambers started to work with The Glines, writing Last Summer at Bluefish Cove for their First Gay American Arts Festival, about the impact upon a woman and her lesbian friends after she is diagnosed with cancer. Chambers was herself diagnosed with cancer in 1981. She continued to write, producing My Blue Heaven for the Second Gay American Arts Festival at the Glines, and The Quintessential Image for the Women's Theatre Conference in Minneapolis.

She died at her home in Greenport, Long Island on February 15, 1983. Starting in 1984, there has been an annual award in her name, the Jane Chambers Playwriting Award.

Works
 Burning: a novel, 1978
 A late snow: a play in two acts, 1979
 Last summer at Bluefish Cove: a play in two acts, 1980
 My blue heaven: a comedy in two acts, 1981
 Warrior at rest: a collection of poetry, 1984
 Chasin' Jason: a novel, 1987

References

1937 births
1983 deaths
American women dramatists and playwrights
American LGBT dramatists and playwrights
LGBT people from South Carolina
20th-century American dramatists and playwrights
20th-century American women writers
Writers from Columbia, South Carolina
LGBT people from Florida
Writers from Orlando, Florida
American lesbian writers
Goddard College alumni
20th-century American LGBT people